Best Screenplay Award (Vietnamese: Giải kịch bản/tác giả kịch bản xuất sắc nhất) is one of the awards presented at the Vietnam Film Festival to recognize a screenwriter with the achievement in writing screenplay which has been determined the best by the juries of feature film, direct-to-video, documentary film and animated film categories.

History 
The category was awarded for the first time in the 2nd Vietnam Film Festival (1973). Đào Trọng Khánh holds the record in this category with four awards for his documentary scripts in 1983, 1988, 2001 and 2015.

The achievement in a direct-to-video feature film, which was first awarded in the 9th Vietnam Film Festival (1990), is no longer awarded since the 20th Vietnam Film Festival (2017). It is because this category has been removed.

Awards

Notes 
Before the 15th Vietnam Film Festival (2007), Documentary film and Science film were counted as one category for judging and grading.

References 

Vietnam Film Festival
Vietnamese screenwriters
Vietnamese film awards